Zakhari Sotirov (born 3 January 1973) is a Bulgarian ski jumper. He competed in the normal hill and large hill events at the 1992 Winter Olympics.

References

1973 births
Living people
Bulgarian male ski jumpers
Olympic ski jumpers of Bulgaria
Ski jumpers at the 1992 Winter Olympics
Place of birth missing (living people)